Haydn Fleury (born July 8, 1996) is a Canadian professional ice hockey defenceman for the Tampa Bay Lightning of the National Hockey League (NHL). Fleury was selected by the Carolina Hurricanes in the first round (seventh overall) of the 2014 NHL Entry Draft.

Playing career
Fleury was selected by the Red Deer Rebels in the second round (43rd overall) of the 2011 WHL Bantam Draft. He was named an alternate captain for the Rebels on November 8, 2013.

Having been projected as a top 10 pick in the 2014 NHL Entry Draft, Fleury was selected 7th overall by the Carolina Hurricanes, the second defenseman selected in that draft. On August 7, 2014, Fleury was signed to a three-year entry-level contract with the Hurricanes.

Fleury was reassigned to the Rebels for the 2014–15 season. On November 5, 2015, Fleury was named an alternate captains for Team WHL at the CHL Canada/Russia Series. Upon a first-round elimination from the WHL playoffs, Fleury was signed to an amateur try-out with the Hurricanes' American Hockey League affiliate, the Charlotte Checkers. On April 12, 2015, in the Checkers final home game, Fleury made his professional debut, scoring a goal, in a 4–3 victory over the Rockford IceHogs. Fleury attended the Hurricanes training camp for the 2015–16 season, then was reassigned to the Rebels for that season. He helped the team advance to the 2016 Memorial Cup, where they reached the Memorial Cup Semi-Final, losing to the Rouyn-Noranda Huskies. Fleury was named to the 2016 Memorial Cup All-Star Team.

Fleury started the 2017–18 season with the Hurricanes. On October 26, 2017, in his eighth game in the NHL, he earned his first NHL points, registering two assists in a 6–3 win against the Toronto Maple Leafs. Fleury was re-assigned to the Checkers on January 25, 2018, after recording 6 points, all assists, in 39 NHL games. However, he was recalled back to the Hurricanes three days later. After the Hurricanes failed to make the post-season, Fleury was assigned to the Checkers to help them in the 2018 Calder Cup playoffs.

The following 2018–19 season, Fleury again made the Hurricanes' opening night roster, but was re-assigned to the Charlotte Checkers on October 17. He was recalled to the NHL on October 31, only to suffer a concussion on November 23 in a game against the Florida Panthers. Fleury was officially placed on injured reserve by the Hurricanes on November 29. Fleury was activated from injured reserve on December 2, 2018, before a game against the Los Angeles Kings.

On July 16, 2019, the Hurricanes re-signed Fleury to a one-year, $850,000 contract extension.

In the pandemic delayed 2020–21 season, Fleury continued to play with the Hurricanes in a third-pairing role. Unable to replicate his previous season offensive totals, Fleury posted just 1 goal in 35 regular season games before he was traded at the trade deadline to the Anaheim Ducks in exchange for Jani Hakanpää and a 2022 sixth-round draft pick on April 12, 2021.

On July 21, 2021, Fleury was selected from the Ducks at the 2021 NHL Expansion Draft by the Seattle Kraken, reuniting him with his brother Cale.

As a free agent after the inaugural season with the Kraken, Fleury was signed to a two-year, $1.525 million contract by the Tampa Bay Lightning on July 13, 2022.

Personal life
Growing up in Carlyle, Saskatchewan, Fleury knew fellow Carlyle native and future NHL player Brenden Morrow, who was then playing junior hockey with the Portland Winterhawks. As a teenager, Morrow would babysit Fleury, who was then a toddler. Morrow and Fleury would later play in the Under-17 tournament exactly 17 years apart.

Fleury has a younger brother, Cale, who was taken 87th overall in the 2017 NHL Entry Draft by the Montreal Canadiens.

Career statistics

Regular season and playoffs

International

Awards and honours

References

External links

 

1996 births
Living people
Anaheim Ducks players
Canadian ice hockey defencemen
Canadian expatriate ice hockey players in the United States
Carolina Hurricanes draft picks
Carolina Hurricanes players
Charlotte Checkers (2010–) players
Ice hockey people from Saskatchewan
National Hockey League first-round draft picks
Red Deer Rebels players
Seattle Kraken players
Tampa Bay Lightning players